The 2010–11 Washington Huskies men's basketball team represented the University of Washington in the 2010–11 college basketball season.  This was head coach Lorenzo Romar's 9th season at Washington. The Huskies played their home games at Alaska Airlines Arena and are members of the Pacific-10 Conference. As the winner of the 2011 Pacific-10 Conference men's basketball tournament, the Huskies earn an automatic bid in the NCAA tournament, the school's 16th appearance in the NCAA tournament. At the national tournament, the Huskies beat Georgia in the second round before falling to eventual Elite Eight contender North Carolina in the third round. They finished the season with a 24–11 record.

Recruits

2010–11 Team

Roster
Source

Abdul Gaddy suffered an ACL tear January 5, 2011 and sat out the remainder of the season.*

Coaching staff

Schedule and results

|-
!colspan=9 style=| Exhibition

|-
!colspan=9 style=|Regular season

|-
!colspan=9 style=| Pac-10 Tournament

|-
!colspan=9 style=| NCAA tournament

Notes
 Isaiah Thomas, who hit the game winning shot in overtime, was named Most Outstanding Player at the Pac-10 Tournament. C.J. Wilcox hit a 3-pointer in regulations to send the game into extra period.
 Named to the Pac-10 All Tournament Team were Terrence Ross and Isaiah Thomas.

References

Washington
Washington Huskies men's basketball seasons
Washington
Washington
Washington
Pac-12 Conference men's basketball tournament championship seasons